KTJS 1420 AM is a radio station licensed to Hobart, Oklahoma. The station broadcasts a country music format and is owned by Fuchs Radio, LLC.

References

External links
KTJS's website

TJS
Country radio stations in the United States